Matthew Booth may refer to:

Matthew Booth (actor), English actor
Matthew Booth (soccer) (born 1977), South African football defender
Matthew Booth (film editor)  on Man on the Train